Telemark is one of the 19 multi-member constituencies of the Storting, the national legislature of Norway. The constituency was established in 1921 following the introduction of proportional representation for elections to the Storting. It consists of the municipalities of Bamble, Drangedal, Fyresdal, Hjartdal, Kragerø, Kviteseid, Midt-Telemark, Nissedal, Nome, Notodden, Porsgrunn, Seljord, Siljan, Skien, Tinn, Tokke and Vinje in the county of Vestfold og Telemark. The constituency currently elects five of the 169 members of the Storting using the open party-list proportional representation electoral system. At the 2021 parliamentary election it had 130,953 registered electors.

Electoral system
Telemark currently elects five of the 169 members of the Storting using the open party-list proportional representation electoral system. Constituency seats are allocated by the County Electoral Committee using the Modified Sainte-Laguë method. Compensatory seats (seats at large) are calculated based on the national vote and are allocated by the National Electoral Committee using the Modified Sainte-Laguë method at the constituency level (one for each constituency). Only parties that reach the 4% national threshold compete for compensatory seats.

Election results

Summary

(Excludes compensatory seats. Figures in italics represent joint lists.)

Detailed

2020s

2021
Results of the 2021 parliamentary election held on 13 September 2021:

The following candidates were elected:
Terje Aasland (Ap); Mahmoud Farahmand (H); Bård Hoksrud (FrP); Tobias Drevland Lund (R); Åslaug Sem-Jacobsen (Sp); and Lene Vågslid (Ap).

2010s

2017
Results of the 2017 parliamentary election held on 11 September 2017:

The following candidates were elected:
Terje Aasland (Ap); Solveig Sundbø Abrahamsen (H); Geir Jørgen Bekkevold (KrF); Bård Hoksrud (FrP); Åslaug Sem-Jacobsen (Sp); and Lene Vågslid (Ap).

2013
Results of the 2013 parliamentary election held on 8 and 9 September 2013:

The following candidates were elected:
Terje Aasland (Ap); Geir Jørgen Bekkevold (KrF); Christian Tynning Bjørnø (Ap); Bård Hoksrud (FrP); Torbjørn Røe Isaksen (H); and Lene Vågslid (Ap).

2000s

2009
Results of the 2009 parliamentary election held on 13 and 14 September 2009:

The following candidates were elected:
Terje Aasland (Ap); Geir Jørgen Bekkevold (KrF); Sigvald Oppebøen Hansen (Ap); Bård Hoksrud (FrP); Torbjørn Røe Isaksen (H); and Gunn Olsen (Ap).

2005
Results of the 2005 parliamentary election held on 11 and 12 September 2005:

The following candidates were elected:
Terje Aasland (Ap); Kåre Fostervold (FrP); Sigvald Oppebøen Hansen (Ap); Bård Hoksrud (FrP); Kari Lise Holmberg (H); and Gunn Olsen (Ap).

2001
Results of the 2001 parliamentary election held on 9 and 10 September 2001:

The following candidates were elected:
John Alvheim (FrP); Sigvald Oppebøen Hansen (Ap); Kari Lise Holmberg (H); Sigbjørn Molvik (SV); Gunn Olsen (Ap); and Bror Yngve Rahm (KrF).

1990s

1997
Results of the 1997 parliamentary election held on 15 September 1997:

The following candidates were elected:
John Alvheim (FrP); Ingvald Godal (H); Sigvald Oppebøen Hansen (Ap); Bent Hegna (Ap); Gunn Olsen (Ap); and Bror Yngve Rahm (KrF).

1993
Results of the 1993 parliamentary election held on 12 and 13 September 1993:

The following candidates were elected:
John Alvheim (FrP); Ragnhild Barland (Ap); Ingvald Godal (H); Sigvald Oppebøen Hansen (Ap); Bent Hegna (Ap); Terje Riis-Johansen (Sp); Børre Rønningen (SV); and Solveig Sollie (KrF).

1980s

1989
Results of the 1989 parliamentary election held on 10 and 11 September 1989:

The following candidates were elected:
John Alvheim (FrP); Ragnhild Barland (Ap); Ingeborg Botnen (Ap); Ingvald Godal (H); Børre Rønningen (SV); and Solveig Sollie (KrF).

1985
Results of the 1985 parliamentary election held on 8 and 9 September 1985:

As the list alliances were entitled to more seats contesting as alliances than they were contesting as individual parties, the distribution of seats was as list alliance votes. The KrF-Sp list alliance's additional seat was allocated to the Christian Democratic Party.

The following candidates were elected:
Ragnhild Barland (Ap); Kjell Bohlin (Ap); Ingeborg Botnen (Ap); Ingvald Godal (H); Jan Helge Jansen (H); and Solveig Sollie (KrF).

1981
Results of the 1981 parliamentary election held on 13 and 14 September 1981:

The following candidates were elected:
Kjell Bohlin (Ap); Ingeborg Botnen (Ap); Sven Trygve Falck (H); Finn Kristensen (Ap); Jørgen Sønstebø (KrF); and Torstein Tynning (H).

1970s

1977
Results of the 1977 parliamentary election held on 11 and 12 September 1977:

The following candidates were elected:
Egil Bergsland (Ap); Kjell Bohlin (Ap); Finn Kristensen (Ap); Jørgen Sønstebø (KrF); Torstein Tynning (H); and Turid Dørumsgaard Varsi (Ap).

1973
Results of the 1973 parliamentary election held on 9 and 10 September 1973:

The following candidates were elected:
Hallvard Eika (V-Sp); Arne Kielland (SV); Finn Kristensen (Ap); Jørgen Sønstebø (KrF); Torstein Tynning (H); and Aslak Versto (Ap).

1960s

1969
Results of the 1969 parliamentary election held on 7 and 8 September 1969:

The following candidates were elected:
Hallvard Eika (V); Finn Kristensen (Ap); Eigil Olaf Liane (Ap); Johannes Østtveit (KrF-Sp); Torstein Tynning (H); and Aslak Versto (Ap).

1965
Results of the 1965 parliamentary election held on 12 and 13 September 1965:

The following candidates were elected:
Eigil Olaf Liane (Ap); Sverre Løberg (Ap); Johannes Østtveit (KrF); Harald Selås (Ap); Torkell Tande (V); and Torstein Tynning (H).

1961
Results of the 1961 parliamentary election held on 11 September 1961:

The following candidates were elected:
Sveinung O. Flaaten (H), 9,096 votes; Jørgen Grave (KrF), 8,268 votes; Eigil Olaf Liane (Ap), 40,562 votes; Sverre Løberg (Ap), 40,559 votes; Harald Selås (Ap), 40,564 votes; and Torkell Tande (V), 9,390 votes.

1950s

1957
Results of the 1957 parliamentary election held on 7 October 1957:

The following candidates were elected:
Halvor Bunkholt (H-Bp); Eigil Olaf Liane (Ap); Sverre Løberg (Ap); Harald Selås (Ap); Torkell Tande (V); and Olav Aslakson Versto (Ap).

1953
Results of the 1953 parliamentary election held on 12 October 1953:

The following candidates were elected:
Jørgen Grave (KrF); Eigil Olaf Liane (Ap); Sverre Løberg (Ap); Harald Selås (Ap); Neri Valen (V); and Olav Aslakson Versto (Ap).

1940s

1949
Results of the 1949 parliamentary election held on 10 October 1949:

The following candidates were elected:
Halvor Bunkholt (H-Bp); Tidemann Flaata Evensen (Ap); Harald Selås (Ap); Neri Valen (V); and Olav Aslakson Versto (Ap).

1945
Results of the 1945 parliamentary election held on 8 October 1945:

As the list alliance was not entitled to more seats contesting as an alliance than it was contesting as individual parties, the distribution of seats was as party votes.

The following candidates were elected:
Tidemann Flaata Evensen (Ap); Margit Schiøtt (V); Harald Selås (Ap); Olav Svalastog (KrF); and Olav Aslakson Versto (Ap).

1930s

1936
Results of the 1936 parliamentary election held on 19 October 1936:

As the list alliance was entitled to more seats contesting as an alliance than it was contesting as individual parties, the distribution of seats was as list alliance votes. The Bp-H list alliance's additional seat was allocated to the Farmers' Party.

The following candidates were elected:
Kristian Hansen (Ap); Andreas Gregarsen Sundbø (Bp); Neri Valen (V); Olav Thorbjørnsen Vegheim (Ap); and Olav Aslakson Versto (Ap).

1933
Results of the 1933 parliamentary election held on 16 October 1933:

As the list alliance was not entitled to more seats contesting as an alliance than it was contesting as individual parties, the distribution of seats was as party votes.

The following candidates were elected:
Jens Hundseid (Bp); Olav Steinnes (Ap); Neri Valen (V); Olav Thorbjørnsen Vegheim (Ap); and Olav Aslakson Versto (Ap).

1930
Results of the 1930 parliamentary election held on 20 October 1930:

As the list alliance was not entitled to more seats contesting as an alliance than it was contesting as individual parties, the distribution of seats was as party votes.

The following candidates were elected:
Jens Hundseid (Bp); Olav Sannes (V); Olav Steinnes (Ap); Neri Valen (V); and Olav Aslakson Versto (Ap).

1920s

1927
Results of the 1927 parliamentary election held on 17 October 1927:

The following candidates were elected:
Jens Hundseid (Bp); Gjermund Grivi (V); Olav Sannes (V); Olav Steinnes (Ap); and Olav Aslakson Versto (Ap).

1924
Results of the 1924 parliamentary election held on 21 October 1924:

The following candidates were elected:
Jens Hundseid (Bp); Herman Løvenskiold (H-FV); Olav Sannes (V); Ketil Skogen (V); and Olav Steinnes (Ap).

1921
Results of the 1921 parliamentary election held on 24 October 1921:

The following candidates were elected:
Gjermund Grivi (V-RF); Herman Løvenskiold (H-FV); Tor Ovaldsen Lundtveit (Ap); Olav Steinnes (Ap); and Ivar Petterson Tveiten (V-RF).

Notes

References

Storting constituencies
Storting constituencies established in 1921
Storting constituency